

Events
The Parliament of Great Britain passes an act prohibiting the British government from accepting plunder taken by privateers.
During his first voyage, Captain Woodes Rogers encounters marooned privateer Alexander Selkirk and rescues him after four years living on Juan Fernández Islands. After sacking Guayaquil, he and Selkirk would visit the Galapagos Islands.
Kiljkover-al is attacked by French privateer Anthony Ferry with three ships and around 300 men. Ferry's fleet proceeds up the Essequibo River burning Indian villages along the way before anchoring opposite of Bartica. The commander of the local garrison offered a ransom of 50,000 gilders, which included slaves and goods along with 2,500 in cash.

Deaths

See also
1707 in piracy
other events of 1708
1709 in piracy
Timeline of piracy

References

Piracy
Piracy by year
1708 in military history